Jack Straker (born 13 April 1993 in Australia) is an Australian rugby union player who plays for the Queensland Reds in Super Rugby. His playing position is prop. He was a late inclusion in the Reds squad for round 7 in 2020.

Reference list

External links
ESPN Rugby profile
itsrugby.co.uk profile

1993 births
New Zealand rugby union players
Living people
Rugby union props
Tasman rugby union players
Canterbury rugby union players
Northland rugby union players
Queensland Reds players